Dermatophyllum is a genus of three or four species of shrubs and small trees in the subfamily Faboideae of the pea family, Fabaceae. The genus is native to southwestern North America from western Texas to New Mexico and Arizona in the United States, and south through Chihuahua, Coahuila, and Nuevo León in northern Mexico. Members of the genus are commonly known as mescalbean, mescal bean, or frijolito. One of the common names of Dermatophyllum secundiflorum is Texas mountain laurel, although the name mountain laurel also refers to the very dissimilar and unrelated genus Kalmia (family Ericaceae) and the name laurel refers generally to plants in the unrelated order Laurales.

Although still commonly treated in the genus Sophora, recent genetic evidence has shown that the mescalbeans are only distantly related to the other species of Sophora.

Species
Dermatophyllum comprises the following species:
 Dermatophyllum arizonicum (S.Watson) Vincent—Arizona mescalbean (Arizona, Chihuahua)
 subsp. arizonicum (S.Watson) Vincent
 subsp. formosum (Kearney & Peebles) Vincent (Arizona)
 Dermatophyllum gypsophilum (B.L. Turner & A.M. Powell) Vincent—Guadalupe mescalbean (southern New Mexico, western Texas, Coahuila)
 Dermatophyllum guadalupense (B.L. Turner & A.M. Powell) B.L.Turner
 Dermatophyllum juanhintonianum (B.L. Turner) B.L. Turner

 Dermatophyllum secundiflorum (Ortega) Gandhi & Reveal—Texas mescalbean (Texas, New Mexico, Coahuila, Nuevo León)

 Dermatophyllum purpusii (Brandegee) Vincent

Description

All parts of the mescalbeans are very poisonous, containing the alkaloid cytisine (not mescaline, as suggested by the name). Nevertheless, evidence exists of the seeds of the plant having been used in a ritualistic context as a hallucinogen (or more accurately; an ordeal poison) by some Native American peoples. The symptoms of cytisine poisoning are very unpleasant. This has led to speculation that the peyote cult may have developed as a relatively safe substitute for the potentially toxic mescalbean, given the close parallels in performance and divination between the two (including leaders of Plains Indian peyote rituals wearing a necklace of mescalbeans).

References

Faboideae
Fabaceae genera